Abrazo or El abraso (meaning Embrace and The embrace in Spanish) may refer to:

Abrazo Community Health Network (Abrazo Health), one of the largest health care delivery system in Arizona, United States
Abrazo Arizona Heart Hospital specializing in cardiovascular care in Phoenix, Arizona
Abrazo Arrowhead Campus
Abrazo Central Campus
Abrazo Maryvale Campus
Abrazo Scottsdale Campus
Abrazo Scottsdale Campus Arizona
Abrazo West Campus
Refuge Abrazo de Maipú, a refuge located on the Trinity Peninsula of the Antarctic Peninsula, now closed

See also
Abrazo de Vergara or in English Convention of Vergara, a treaty successfully ending the major fighting in Spain's First Carlist War
Abrazos Rotos or in English Broken Embraces, a 2009 Spanish romantic thriller film written, produced, and directed by Pedro Almodóvar
El abrazo (disambiguation)